Scoop FM is a Haitian radio station based out of Port-au-Prince, Haiti that provides sports news, cultural content, business news, and election and political news in French.

External links
 Listen Online on ZenoLive
 Listen Online on Haiti Media Live

Radio stations in Haiti